CBQT-FM is a Canadian radio station. It is the CBC Radio One station in Thunder Bay, Ontario, broadcasting at 88.3 FM, and serves all of Northwestern Ontario through a network of relay transmitters.

History
The station was launched in 1973 as CBQ on 800 AM. The 800 frequency had been vacated earlier that year by the defunct CJLX. CBQ Radio's inaugural morning broadcast in December 1973 made it the second city in Ontario to get a regional broadcast centre. The call sign CBQ was a last minute choice by station managers since CBL (for Lakehead) or CBT (for Thunder Bay) were already taken by the CBC stations in Toronto and Grand Falls-Windsor, Newfoundland and Labrabor, respectively. Instead the letter Q was chosen for Quetico Provincial Park near Atikokan, which is west of Thunder Bay.

Prior to CBQ's launch, CBC Radio programming aired on private affiliate CFPA.

CBQ moved to FM as CBQT-FM in 1990. The CBQ-FM callsign was already in use by the CBC Stereo sister station on 101.7 FM. Some of the relay transmitters for CBQT previously rebroadcast CBL in Toronto.

Local programming
The station's local program is Superior Morning, hosted by Lisa Laco. The station formerly also produced Voyage North, hosted by Gerald Graham in the afternoon, although that program was replaced in August 2014 by Up North, hosted by Jessica Pope from the studios of CBCS-FM in Sudbury. The move faced some protest in the city, with Thunder Bay City Council passing a unanimous resolution requesting that the federal government rescind its 2012 funding cuts to the CBC.

CBQT's rebroadcast transmitters in the Central time zone also simulcast the 5 p.m. hour of local programming from CBW in Winnipeg so that the network's World at Six airs at 6 p.m. local time.

The CBC Radio studio in Thunder Bay also produces the hourly weekend weather reports for all of Ontario after the hourly news break.

Repeaters

CFTL-FM, a radio station in Big Trout Lake owned by the Ayamowin Communications Society, rebroadcasts CBQT-FM part-time, with additional programming originating from CKWT-FM Sioux Lookout. It is currently unknown if this station is still broadcasting.

AM to FM
Some of CBQT-FM's repeaters currently operate on the AM dial. Future plans are possible to convert the remaining repeaters to the FM dial.

On December 21, 2012, the CBC filed an application to the CRTC to convert the following AM transmitters to the FM dial.

CBOL 1450 to 91.3 with 50 watts 
CBLH 1010 to 92.3 with 50 watts 

The CRTC approved the applications for both transmitters on May 8, 2013.

On January 21, 2013, the CBC filed an application to the CRTC to convert CBLS 1240 to 95.3 FM with 500 watts (average & maximum ERP). Antenna height will be 182 metres (EHAAT) and the radiation pattern will be non-directional. As well this new FM transmitter will serve the nearby town of Hudson and Hudson's transmitter (CBQW 1340) was deleted as well. The conversion was approved by the CRTC on April 17, 2013.

On May 14, 2015, the CBC applied to convert CBLN 1240 to 98.1 MHz with 50 watts, antenna height 9.1 metres (EHAAT) with a non-directional antenna pattern. The CRTC approved the CBC's application on July 28, 2015.

On December 22, 2016, the CBC applied to convert CBLW 1010 to 97.7 MHz. The CRTC approved the CBC's application to move CBLW from the AM band to the FM band on March 16, 2017.

On March 2, 2017, the CBC applied to convert CBLM 1090 to 107.5 MHz. CBEH 1010 Terrace Bay was shut down.

On November 22, 2017, the CBC applied to convert CBOI 690 to 95.5 MHz. The CRTC approved the CBC's application to move CBOI to the FM band on February 5, 2018. On March 3, 2022 the CBC reapplied to the CRTC to add a new FM transmitter at Ear Falls to replace CBOI AM  which was approved on May 3, 2022.

On March 8, 2019, the CBC applied to convert CBLB 1340 to 90.9 MHz. This application was approved on May 13, 2019.

References

External links
 CBC Thunder Bay
 

Bqt
Bqt
Radio stations established in 1973
1973 establishments in Ontario